But What Will the Neighbors Think is the second studio album by American country music artist Rodney Crowell. It was released in 1980 (see 1980 in country music) by Warner Bros. Records. It reached #64 on the Top Country Albums chart and #155 on the Billboard 200 albums chart. The songs, "Ashes by Now", "Ain't No Money" and "Here Come the 80's" were released as singles. "Ashes by Now" only reached #78 on the country charts and #37 on the Billboard Hot 100 while the other two singles failed to chart. This album has more of a rock & roll influence than Crowell's debut, Ain't Living Long Like This. The album was rereleased on compact disc in 2005.

Content 
The song "Queen of Hearts" was first recorded in 1979 by Welsh rock musician Dave Edmunds for his album Repeat When Necessary. It was also a single for Juice Newton, whose version was a number 2 hit on the Billboard Hot 100 in 1981.

Most of the songs on this album would later be covered by other country artists. "Ain't No Money" was covered in 1982 by Crowell's then wife, Rosanne Cash on her album, Somewhere in the Stars.

"It's Only Rock & Roll" was covered in 1983 by both Emmylou Harris and Waylon Jennings on their respective albums White Shoes and It's Only Rock & Roll.

"On a Real Good Night" was written by Crowell but was first recorded by Bobby Bare for his 1978 album Sleep Wherever I Fall. Albert Lee, who played guitar for this album, performed the song on his 1979 album Hiding.

Emmylou Harris also covered "Ashes by Now" on her 1981 album Evangeline. It is also featured on Lee Ann Womack's album I Hope You Dance.

Guy Clark would later record his own version of "Heartbroke", which he wrote, on his 1981 album South Coast of Texas. In 1982 George Strait would record a version on his second album Strait From The Heart. The song was also a number 1 hit for Ricky Skaggs in 1982.

Track listing 
All tracks written by Rodney Crowell unless noted
 "Here Come the 80's" – 4:15
 "Ain't No Money" – 3:58
 "Oh What a Feeling" (Keith Sykes) – 2:58
 "It's Only Rock & Roll" – 3:18
 "On a Real Good Night" – 3:54
 "Ashes by Now" – 4:07
 "Heartbroke" (Guy Clark) – 3:33
 "Queen of Hearts" (Hank DeVito) – 3:38
 "Blues in the Daytime" – 4:19
 "The One About England" – 3:38

Personnel 
 Hank DeVito – steel guitar
 Amos Garrett – acoustic guitar
 Emory Gordy Jr. – bass guitar
 Albert Lee – guitar, piano, background vocals
 Craig Leon – flute, piano
 Tony Brown – piano
 Larrie Londin – drums
 Frank Reckard – guitar
 Tower of Power – horns
 Don Whaley – background vocals
 Larry Willoughby – background vocals
 Steve Wood – keyboards, background vocals

Chart performance

Album

Singles

Sources 

 CMT
 Allmusic (see infobox)
 AOL Music profile

1980 albums
Rodney Crowell albums
Albums produced by Craig Leon
Albums produced by Rodney Crowell
Warner Records albums